The Last DJ is the 11th studio album by American rock band Tom Petty and the Heartbreakers. The title track, "Money Becomes King", "Joe" and "Can't Stop the Sun" are all critical of greed in the music industry.

A "limited edition" digipack version of the album was also released, including a DVD of music videos and other footage shot during the album's production.

The album reached number 9 on the Billboard 200, aided by the single "The Last DJ", which peaked at number 22 on Billboard's Mainstream Rock Tracks chart in 2002. As of 2010, The Last DJ had sold 353,000 copies in the United States, according to Nielsen SoundScan.

The album marks the return of original Heartbreaker Ron Blair on bass guitar, replacing his own replacement, the ailing Howie Epstein. His return was late in the recording process, however, and Petty and Campbell contribute most of the bass work themselves.

The title track (which was the first single) and "Dreamville" were included on the compilation The Best of Everything.

Track listing
All songs written by Tom Petty except where noted.

Personnel
Tom Petty and the Heartbreakers
Tom Petty – guitars, vocals, piano, ukulele, bass guitar on "The Last DJ", "Money Becomes King", "Joe", "Like a Diamond", "Blue Sunday", "You and Me" and "Have Love Will Travel"
Mike Campbell – guitars, bass guitar on "Dreamville", "When a Kid Goes Bad", and "The Man Who Loves Women"
Benmont Tench – piano, organ, various keyboards
Scott Thurston – guitar, lap steel guitar, ukulele, background vocals
Ron Blair – bass guitar on "Lost Children" and "Can't Stop the Sun"
Steve Ferrone – drums

Additional musicians 
Jon Brion – orchestration, conductor
Lindsey Buckingham – background vocals on "The Man Who Loves Women"
Lenny Castro – percussion

Production
Mike Campbell – producer
Richard Dodd – recording engineer
George Drakoulias – producer
Ryan Hewitt – assistant engineer
Steve McGrath – demo engineer
Tom Petty – producer
Jim Scott – recording engineer
Ed Thacker – additional engineer

Charts

References

External links
 

Tom Petty albums
2002 albums
Albums produced by Tom Petty
Albums produced by George Drakoulias
Warner Records albums